The 1950 Railway Cup Hurling Championship was the 24th series of the inter-provincial hurling Railway Cup. Three matches were played between 12 February 1950 and 17 March 1950 to decide the title. It was contested by Connacht, Leinster, Munster and Ulster.

Munster entered the championship as the defending champions.

On 17 March 1950, Munster won the Railway Cup after a 0-09 to 1-03 defeat of Leinster in the final at Croke Park, Dublin. It was their 18th Railway Cup title overall and their third title in succession.

Munster's Jimmy Kennedy was the Railway Cup top scorer with 4-01.

Results

Semi-finals

Final

Top scorers

Overall

Sources

 Donegan, Des, The Complete Handbook of Gaelic Games (DBA Publications Limited, 2005).

References

Railway Cup Hurling Championship
Railway Cup Hurling Championship